The 2012 Northwestern Wildcats football team represented Northwestern University during the 2012 NCAA Division I FBS football season. Pat Fitzgerald, in his seventh season at Northwestern, was the team's head coach. The Wildcats home games were played at Ryan Field in Evanston, Illinois. They were members of the Legends Division of the Big Ten Conference. The Wildcats won their first bowl game since the 1949 Rose Bowl against California by defeating Mississippi State in the Gator Bowl 34–20. They finished the season 10–3 (5–3 Big Ten).

Previous season
In 2011 the Wildcats had a 6–7 record, ending the season with a 33–22 loss to Texas A&M in the 2011 Meineke Car Care Bowl of Texas.

Preseason

Recruiting
Northwestern signed 21 recruits to letters-of-intent on National Signing Day on February 1, 2012.

Transfers
Wide receiver Kyle Prater transferred to Northwestern from USC on January 28, 2012, after being injured during most of the 2011 season and redshirting in 2010. The Wildcats requested a waiver to allow Prater to play immediately in 2012, as he transferred to a school close to home in order to care for a family member. Sophomore running back Adonis Smith, who was thought to be a candidate for the starting running back job in 2012 after rushing for 266 yards in 2011, announced his intent to transfer from Northwestern on February 22. He decided to transfer to UNLV. Defensive back Quinn Evans transferred to Northwestern after graduating from Stanford in June 2012. After missing the entire 2011 season because of injury, he chose to attend Northwestern as a graduate student with a year of college football eligibility remaining.

Schedule
The schedule is as follows:

Rankings

Game summaries

Syracuse

Sources:

The game got off to a slow start with some notable miscues on Northwestern's special teams play. All of which was quickly forgotten when Venric Mark scored an 82-yard touchdown on a punt return, the first return touchdown of his career. Northwestern continued to dominate offensively on the work of Mark and Kain Colter, taking a 35–13 lead in the middle of the 3rd quarter. The Orange then scored 4 straight touchdowns to lead 41–35 by attacking the young Northwestern secondary with deep passes to the outside. With under 3 minutes left and needing a score to win, Northwestern changed quarterbacks. Trevor Siemian came on to lead a 75-yard drive that scored the go-ahead touchdown. Northwestern survived to win and remain 7–0 in season openers under Pat Fitzgerald.

Vanderbilt

Sources:

Boston College

Sources:

South Dakota

Sources:

Indiana

Sources:

Penn State

Roster

References

External links

Northwestern
Northwestern Wildcats football seasons
Gator Bowl champion seasons
Northwestern Wildcats football